Trametes nivosa is a fungal plant pathogen affecting pears and nectarines.

References

Polyporaceae
Fungal tree pathogens and diseases
Stone fruit tree diseases
Taxa named by Miles Joseph Berkeley
Fungi described in 1856